The Holmesdale School is a coeducational high school and sixth form located in Snodland, Kent.

It was previously a foundation school administered by Kent County Council and The Malling Holmesdale Federation Trust, which also included The Malling School. It was also part of the Mid Kent Learning Alliance. In September 2022 The Holmesdale School converted to academy status, and is now sponsored by the Swale Academies Trust.

The Holmesdale School offers GCSEs and BTECs as programmes of study for pupils, while students in the sixth form have the option to study from a range of A Levels and further BTECs. The school was previously designated as a Technology College and was renamed Holmesdale Technology College for a time. Holmesdale Technology College was renamed The Holmesdale School in April 2016, but the school continues to specialise in STEM subjects (Science, Technology, Engineering and Mathematics).

They play a number of different sports including dodgeball and Korfball

References

External links
The Holmesdale School official website

Secondary schools in Kent
Academies in Kent
Snodland